Two-dimensional singular-value decomposition (2DSVD) computes the low-rank approximation of a set of matrices such as 2D images or weather maps in a manner almost identical to SVD (singular-value decomposition) which computes the low-rank approximation of a single matrix (or a set of 1D vectors).

SVD

Let matrix  contains the set of 1D vectors which have been centered. In PCA/SVD, we construct covariance matrix  and Gram matrix 
  , 
Since  and  we have
 

2DSVD

Here we deal with a set of 2D matrices . Suppose they are centered . We construct row–row and column–column covariance matrices

  and 

We approximate  as

 

in identical fashion as in SVD.

 

Error bounds similar to Eckard–Young theorem also exist.

2DSVD is mostly used in image compression and representation.

References
 Chris Ding and Jieping Ye. "Two-dimensional Singular Value Decomposition (2DSVD) for 2D Maps and Images". Proc. SIAM Int'l Conf. Data Mining (SDM'05), pp. 32–43, April 2005. http://ranger.uta.edu/~chqding/papers/2dsvdSDM05.pdf
 Jieping Ye. "Generalized Low Rank Approximations of Matrices". Machine Learning Journal. Vol. 61, pp. 167–191, 2005.

Singular value decomposition